Kenneth Leblanc (born February 13, 1968) is a Canadian bobsledder who competed in the late 1980s and early 1990s. He then returned to bobsleigh in 1997 and competed until the 2002 Winter Olympics in Salt Lake City.

Leblanc won a bronze medal in the four-man event at the 1999 FIBT World Championships in Cortina d'Ampezzo. He was also part of the four-man team that won the overall World Cup in 1989-90.

Competing in four Winter Olympics, his best finish was fourth in the four-man event at Albertville in 1992.

Prior to his career in bobsleigh, Leblanc also competed in athletics

References
Bobsleigh four-man world championship medalists since 1930
1992 bobsleigh four-man results
Canoe.ca 1998 profile
Canoe.ca 2002 profile
Ken Leblanc -Canadian Olympians- Library & Archives Canada
 Ken LeBlanc Biography and Olympic Results | Olympics at Sports-Reference.com 
Ken Leblanc Bobsleigh Salt Lake the Globe and Mail
Canoe 2002 Games, Team Canada, Ken Leblanc

1968 births
Bobsledders at the 1988 Winter Olympics
Bobsledders at the 1992 Winter Olympics
Bobsledders at the 1998 Winter Olympics
Bobsledders at the 2002 Winter Olympics
Canadian male bobsledders
Living people
Olympic bobsledders of Canada
Sportspeople from Ottawa